George Charles Lees (25 June 1924 – 23 February 1988) was an English amateur football defender who played for the Danish side Boldklubben Frem for nine years, making 163 first-team appearances, scoring two goals. In 1956 Lees became the first ever foreign player to play in a Danish cup final.

In his civil life Lees was employed in printing.

References

External links
 Boldklubben Frem profile 

1924 births
1988 deaths
English footballers
English expatriate footballers
Boldklubben Frem players
Association football defenders
Expatriate men's footballers in Denmark
English expatriate sportspeople in Denmark